The 2016–17 Iona Gaels men's basketball team represented Iona College during the 2016–17 NCAA Division I men's basketball season. The Gaels, led by seventh year head coach Tim Cluess, played their home games at the Hynes Athletic Center in New Rochelle, New York as members of the Metro Atlantic Athletic Conference (MAAC). They finished the season 22–13, 12–8 in MAAC play to finish in a tie for third place. They defeated Rider, Saint Peter's and Siena to be champions of the MAAC tournament. They received the MAAC's automatic bid to the NCAA tournament where they lost in the first round to Oregon.

Previous season 
The Gaels finished the 2015–16 season 22–11, 16–4 in MAAC play to finish in second place. They defeated Canisius, Siena, and Monmouth to win the MAAC tournament and earn the conference's automatic bid to the NCAA tournament. As a No. 13 seed in the Tournament, they lost in the first round to Iowa State.

Roster

Schedule and results

|-
!colspan=9 style=| Regular season

|-
!colspan=9 style=|MAAC tournament

|-
!colspan=9 style=|NCAA tournament

References

Iona Gaels men's basketball seasons
Iona
Iona